Beautiful Ohio is a 2006 American film, directed by Chad Lowe and starring William Hurt, Michelle Trachtenberg, and Julianna Margulies. The film, based on the short story "Batorsag and Szerelem" by Ethan Canin, is a coming of age drama/comedy set in the 1970s. The film was shown at the 2006 AFI Fest. It also showed at the 2007 Sarasota Film Festival, where Trachtenberg won the award for Breakthrough Performance and Lowe won the Red Star Award.

Cast
 William Hurt as Simon Messerman
 Julianna Margulies as Mrs. Cubano
 Michelle Trachtenberg as Sandra
 Brett Davern as William
 David Call as Clive
 Rita Wilson as Judith Messerman
 Jeremy Allen White as Young Clive

References

External links
 
 

2006 films
2006 comedy-drama films
American comedy-drama films
2006 directorial debut films
2000s English-language films
2000s American films